Tempora is the codeword for a formerly-secret computer system that is used by the British Government Communications Headquarters (GCHQ). This system is used to buffer most Internet communications that are extracted from fibre-optic cables, so these can be processed and searched at a later time. It was tested from 2008 and became operational in late 2011.

Tempora uses intercepts on the fibre-optic cables that serve as the backbone of the Internet to gain access to large amounts of Internet users' personal data, without any individual suspicion or targeting. The intercepts are placed in the United Kingdom and overseas, with the knowledge of companies owning either the cables or landing stations.

The existence of Tempora was revealed by Edward Snowden, a former American intelligence contractor who leaked information about the program to former Guardian journalist Glenn Greenwald in May 2013 as part of his revelations of government-sponsored mass surveillance programs. Documents Snowden acquired showed that data collected by the Tempora program is shared with the National Security Agency of the United States.

Operation
According to Edward Snowden, Tempora has two principal components called "Mastering the Internet" (MTI) and "Global Telecoms Exploitation" (GTE). He claimed that each is intended to collate online and telephone traffic. This contradicts two original documents, which say that Tempora is only for Internet traffic, just like the XKeyscore system of the NSA, components of which are incorporated in Tempora.

It is alleged that GCHQ produces larger amounts of metadata than NSA. By May 2012, 300 GCHQ analysts and 250 NSA analysts had been assigned to sort data.

The Guardian claims that no distinction is made in the gathering of data between public citizens and targeted suspects. Tempora is said to include recordings of telephone calls, the content of email messages, Facebook entries and the personal Internet history of users. Snowden said of Tempora that "It's not just a U.S. problem. The U.K. has a huge dog in this fight...They [GCHQ] are worse than the U.S."

Claims exist that Tempora was possible only by way of secret agreements with commercial companies, described in Snowden's leaked documents as "intercept partners". Some companies are alleged to have been paid for their co-operation. Snowden also alleged that GCHQ staff were urged to disguise the origin of material in their reports for fear that the role of the companies as intercept partners would cause "high-level political fallout". The companies are forbidden to reveal the existence of warrants compelling them to allow GCHQ access to the cables. If the companies fail to comply they can be compelled to do so.

Lawyers for GCHQ said it would be impossible to list the total number of people targeted by Tempora because "this would be an infinite list which we couldn't manage".

GCHQ set up a three-year trial at the GCHQ Bude in Cornwall. GCHQ had probes attached to more than 201 Internet links by mid-2011; each probe carried 10 gigabits of data a second. NSA analysts were brought into the trials, and Tempora was launched in 2011, with data shared with the NSA. Ongoing technical work is expanding GCHQ's capacity to collect data from new super cables that carry data at 100 gigabits a second. The data is preserved for three days while metadata is kept for thirty days.

TEMPORA comprises different components, like the actual access points to fibre-optic cables, a sanitisation program codenamed POKERFACE, the XKEYSCORE system developed by NSA, and a Massive Volume Reduction (MVR) capability.

In May 2012, GCHQ had TEMPORA systems installed at the following locations:
 16 for 10 gigabit/second cables at the CPC processing centre
 7 for 10 gigabit/second cables at the OPC processing centre
 23 for 10 gigabit/second cables at the RPC1 processing centre

Reactions

UK Defence officials issued a confidential DA-Notice to the BBC and other media asking the media to refrain from running further stories related to surveillance leaks including US PRISM program and the British involvement therein.

The US Army has restricted its employees' access to the Guardian website since the beginning of the NSA leaks of PRISM and Tempora "in order to prevent an unauthorized disclosure of classified information."

German Federal Minister of Justice Sabine Leutheusser-Schnarrenberger tweeted that she considered the program an "Alptraum" ("nightmare") and demanded that European Union institutions investigate the matter.

Jan Philipp Albrecht, German Member of the European Parliament and spokesperson for Justice and Home Affairs of the Greens/EFA parliamentary group, called for an infringement procedure against the United Kingdom for having violated its obligations relating to the protection of individuals with regard to the processing of personal data under Article 16 of the Treaties of the European Union.

In September 2018, the European Court of Human Rights ruled that the UK’s mass data interception and retention programmes, including TEMPORA, "was unlawful and incompatible with the conditions necessary for a democratic society".

See also

 INDECT – European Union project
 Karma Police (surveillance program)
 List of government surveillance projects
 Mass surveillance in the United Kingdom
 MUSCULAR
 Signals intelligence
 Tempora mutantur – Latin adage
 UKUSA SIGINT Agreement
 NSA ANT catalog
 Communications Assistance for Law Enforcement Act (CALEA)
 Global surveillance disclosures (2013–present)
 Website visitor tracking
 Browsing history
 Web analytics
 Web mining
 Surveillance
 Internet privacy

References

External links
 TEMPORA - "The World's Largest XKEYSCORE" - Is Now Available to Qualified NSA Users, released by Der Spiegel on 18 June 2014
 
 
 

Privacy of telecommunications
Secret government programs
Mass surveillance
Surveillance
Surveillance scandals
War on terror
GCHQ operations
Internet in the United Kingdom
Intelligence agency programmes revealed by Edward Snowden